Sélibaby is a capital town  and department of the Guidimaka Region, Mauritania. It is divided into a number of "quartiers" which include "College", "Silo", 'Ferlo"  , "nezaha" , "saada" , "el jedida" "Bambaradougou" amongst many others. Selibaby also has a regional hospital, funded by the Chinese government and partially staffed by Chinese doctors and is the headquarters of the regional director of health. Selibaby is a centre for NGOs who operate in the region.

Climate
Sélibaby has a hot semi-arid climate (Köppen BSh).

Guidimaka Region
Regional capitals in Mauritania
Communes of Mauritania